Saving Private Tootsie is a 2002 Thai film. The film is directed by Kittikorn Liasirikun.

In the film, several katoeys (ladyboys) survive a plane crash in the jungle of an (unidentified) neighbouring country and several soldiers come to rescue them.

The film was sold for remake rights in the United States.

Cast
 Sorapong Chatree as Sgt. Rerng
 Akara Amarttayakul (as Puthichai Amatayakul) as Capt. Sompong
  as Kasem
 Ornnapa Krissadee as Som Ying
  as Chicha
  as PFC Pakorn
 Aed Carabao as Pang Long
 Theeradanai Suwannahom
 Boriwat Yuto

References

External links
 

2002 films
Kathoey
Thai LGBT-related films
Thai-language films
Transgender-related films
Film Bangkok films
2002 LGBT-related films
Films directed by Kittikorn Liasirikun
2000s English-language films